Hyphenated-man (stylized in all lowercase) is the fourth solo album by Mike Watt, and the first full-length recording he made under his own name since parting with Columbia Records in 2005. Initially released in Japan by Parabolica Records in October 2010, the album was released in the rest of the world on clenchedwrench, an independent record label newly founded by Watt. He is accompanied on the album by his Mike Watt + The Missingmen bandmates, guitarist Tom Watson and drummer Raul Morales.

Writing and recording
The album is a loose concept album (Watt refers to it as his third "punk opera") of thirty short songs, all two minutes or under (most average about a minute and a half) inspired by creatures from the paintings of Hieronymous Bosch; each of the thirty song titles is derived from a nickname Watt came up with for each creature, "since I don't know three-hundred-year-old Dutch". According to Watt, the album "is quite different" from his previous punk operas Contemplating the Engine Room and The Secondman's Middle Stand "in that it has no standard narrative... meaning no regular beginning-middle-end." Another inspiration woven into the album's lyrics was taken from "the idea of Dorothy from The Wizard of Oz kind of tripping on what men do to 'be' men."

Musically, Watt was inspired to write short songs again after re-immersing himself in the back catalog of his first band, The Minutemen prior to and in the course of filming the documentary We Jam Econo. Watt had seen a parallel between the album's initial concept and The Minutemen in "how many little trips could roll up into one big one." Inspired by his earlier music Watt still wanted to take into account the changes in his life saying "I would write lyrics dealing with myself as a middle-aged punk rocker, which is something the Minutemen never dealt with really."

The music to all thirty songs was written by Watt on one of Watt's late friend and Minutemen bandmate D. Boon's Fender Telecasters.

The guitar and drum tracks were recorded in three days in May 2009 during a planned break in a tour Watt undertook with the Missingmen, at Studio G in Brooklyn, New York, the studio of ex-Pere Ubu bassist Tony Maimone. Watson and Morales recorded their parts without the benefit of having heard the bass line or vocals first. Watt overdubbed his vocals and bass parts thirteen months later.

Track listing
 Arrow-Pierced-Egg-Man
 Beak-Holding-Letter-Man
 Hammering-Castle-Bird-Man
 Bird-In-The-Helmet-Man
 Belly-Stabbed-Man
 Stuffed-In-The-Drum-Man
 Baby-Cradling-Tree-Man
 Hollowed-Out-Man
 Finger-Pointing-Man
 Own-Horn-Blowing-Man
 Fryingpan-Man
 Head-And-Feet-Only-Man
 Shield-Shouldered-Man
 Cherry-Head-Lover-Man
 Pinned-To-The-Table-Man
 Mouse-Headed-Man
 Antlered-Man
 Confused-Parts-Man
 Bell-Rung-Man
 Boot-Wearing-Fish-Man
 Thistle-Headed-Man
 Funnel-Capped-Man
 Blowing-It-Out-Both-Ends-Man
 Jug-Footed-Man
 Lute-And-Dagger-Man
 Mockery-Robed-Man
 Hill-Man
 Hell-Building-Man
 Man-Shitting-Man
 Wheel-Bound-Man

Personnel
 Mike Watt – vocals, bass, songwriter, producer
 Tom Watson – guitars
 Raul Morales – drums
 Tony Maimone – engineer, mixer

References and footnotes

External links
Mike Watt's Hoot Page

Mike Watt albums
2010 albums
2011 albums
Concept albums